Tetrino is a rural locality (a selo) in Tersky District of Murmansk Oblast, Russia, located on the Kola Peninsula at a height of  above sea level. Population: 18 (2010 Census).

History
Tetrino was established in 1660, when some of the residents of Varzuga moved out to the coast. In 1785, its population consisted of five households. In 1854–1855, Tetrino was attacked by the English. A school was opened in 1890. In 1914, the population was 515 inhabitants living in 85 households.

References

Notes

Sources

Rural localities in Murmansk Oblast
Populated places established in 1660
1660 establishments in Russia
